C. Travis Johnson is an American politician serving as a member of the Louisiana House of Representatives from the 21st district. Elected on November 16, 2019, he assumed office on January 13, 2020.

Early life and education 
Johnson is a native of Ferriday, Louisiana. He earned a Bachelor of Science degree in economics and political science from Louisiana Tech University and a Master of Arts in public administration from Belhaven University.

Career 
Johnson served as the regional political director for Senator Mary Landrieu. In September 2020, Johnson became the vice chair of the Louisiana's Democratic State Central Committee. He also owns a restaurant in Vidalia, Louisiana. Johnson was elected to the Louisiana House of Representatives on November 16, 2019, and assumed office on January 13, 2020.

References 

Living people
People from Ferriday, Louisiana
Louisiana State University alumni
Belhaven University alumni
People from Vidalia, Louisiana
Democratic Party members of the Louisiana House of Representatives
Year of birth missing (living people)